The Union Evangelical Church is a historic church on Ridge Road in Addison, Maine.  Built about 1860, it is a well-preserved example of a transitional Greek Revival-Gothic Revival church building.   It was listed on the National Register of Historic Places in 1996.

Description and history
The Union Evangelical Church is located west of Addison's village center, at the junction of Ridge Road with Church Hill Lane.  It is set on a rise overlooking the Pleasant River, with views of the Maine coast.  The building is a single-story wood frame structure, with a gabled roof, clapboard siding, and granite foundation.  The roof is topped by a two-stage square tower, consisting of a low first stage, and a belfry stage with rectangular louvers in each wall, framed by projecting hoods and pilasters.  A simple dentillated cornice caps that stage.  The tower was apparently once topped by crenellations.  The building corners have pilasters with lancet-arched panels, rising to a broad entablature extending across the front and sides.  The front facade is symmetrical, with a pair of entrances on either side of a central pair of long and narrow windows.  The window and doors are topped by Gothic drip molding, a detail carried to the windows on the sides.

The first church was built on this site in 1789, and was destroyed in a gale in 1839.  The second church, built soon afterward, was destroyed by fire resulting from a lightning strike in 1860.  The present church was built soon afterward; its designer and builder are not known, but the church is stylistically similar to another in nearby Columbia.

See also
National Register of Historic Places listings in Washington County, Maine

References

Churches in Washington County, Maine
Churches on the National Register of Historic Places in Maine
Gothic Revival church buildings in Maine
Churches completed in 1860
National Register of Historic Places in Washington County, Maine